Delaya is a genus of annelids belonging to the family Haplotaxidae.

The species of this genus are found in Europe.

Species:

Delaya bureschi 
Delaya cantabronensis 
Delaya corbarensis 
Delaya leruthi 
Delaya navarrensis

References

Annelids